List of Old Salopians is a list of some of the many notable old boys of Shrewsbury School, a leading UK independent boarding and day school in Shrewsbury, in Shropshire, England.

Old Salopians

A

 Francis William Lauderdale Adams (1862–1893), writer
 Sir James Adams  (1932–2020), ambassador to Tunisia (1984–1987) and Egypt (1987–1992)
 John Adams, (before 1670−1738), cartographer
 Sir Thomas Adams, 1st Baronet (1586–1668), Lord Mayor of the City of London 1654–65
 Harold Ackroyd  (1877–1917), soldier and recipient of the Victoria Cross 
 Sir John Lawson Andrews  (1903–1986), Deputy Prime Minister of Northern Ireland and son of Prime Minister John Miller Andrews
 John Langshaw Austin (1911–1960), philosopher of language, White's Professor of Moral Philosophy

B

 Charles Baillie (born 1989), financial regulatory specialist
 Alan Barber (1905–1985), cricketer and headmaster of Ludgrove
 Robert Bardsley  (1890–1952), cricketer and colonial administrator 
 Edward Barnard (1992–), cricketer 
 Mike Barnard (1990–), cricketer
 Sir Alexander Fitzwilliam Barrington, 7th Baronet (1909–2003), landowner
 Douglas Bartles-Smith (1937–2014), priest and Archdeacon of Southwark 1985–2004
 William Henry Bateson (1812–1881), scholar and Master of St. John's College, Cambridge 1857–1881
 Sir Cecil Beadon  (1816–1880), administrator in India
 Christopher Beazley (born 1952), Member of the European Parliament 1984-2009
 Andrew Berry (born 1963), evolutionary biologist and historian of science at Harvard
 John Best (1821–1865), politician and barrister
 Henry Edward James Bevan  (1854–1935), Archdeacon of Middlesex
 Peter Blagg (1918–1943), cricketer and soldier 
 Peter Renshaw Blaker, Baron Blaker  (1922–2009), politician
 David Blakely, murder victim. He was shot dead by Ruth Ellis, the last woman to be hanged in Britain.
 The Ven. Charles Blakeway (1868–1922), Archdeacon of Stafford 1911–22
 Christopher Booker (1937–2019), journalist, co-founder of Private Eye
 Tim Booth (1960–), lead singer of the band James
 Sir James Bourne, 1st Baronet (1812–1882), politician
 Piers Brendon (born 1940), historian
 John Breynton (1719–1799), minister and missionary in Nova Scotia
 Lieutenant General Sir Harold Bridgwood Walker  (1862–1934), senior British Army commander 
 Mynors Bright (1818–1883), academic and Master of Magdalene College, Cambridge 
 John Brockbank (1848–1896), footballer who played for England as a forward in the first international match against Scotland.
 Peter Brown  (born 1935), historian of Late Antiquity, Fellow of All Souls College, Oxford
 Samuel Browne, (1574/5–1632), Church of England clergyman
 Lieutenant-Colonel Barwick Sharpe Browne (1881–1963), officer and librarian in the Institute of Archaeology 
 Colin Boumphrey  (1897–1945), cricketer and Royal Air Force officer
 Donald Boumphrey  (1892–1971), cricketer, educator and British Army officer
 Samuel Hawksley Burbury  (1831–1911), mathematician
 John Burrell (1910–1972), theatre director
 Robert Burn (1829–1904), classical scholar, archeologist and Fellow of Trinity College, Cambridge 
 John Burrough (1873–1922), cricketer 
 Charles Burney  (1726–1814), musician, composer, music historian
 Omar 'Ali Bolkiah (born 1986), crown prince of the Sultanate of Brunei
 Samuel Butler (1835–1902), iconoclastic author of Erewhon and The Way of All Flesh.

C

 Sir Edward John Cameron , (1858–1947), British colonial administrator, Governor of Gambia 1914–1920
 Sir Philip Montgomery Campbell   (born 1951), Editor-in-Chief of Nature
 Sir Frederick Catherwood (1925–2015), politician, writer, and vice-president of European Parliament 
 Bruce Clark (1958-), journalist and author 
 Miles Clark (1960-1993), author, journalist and explorer  
 George Sidney Roberts Kitson Clark (1900–1975), historian
 William George Clark (1821–1878), literary and classical scholar
 William Clarke (1695–1771), antiquary
 Rowland Clegg-Hill, 3rd Viscount Hill (1833–1895), politician
 Richard Charles Cobb  (1917–1996), historian and essayist
 Athelstan John Cornish-Bowden (1943-), biochemist
 Edward Meredith Cope (1818–1873), classical scholar
 Edward Corbet, (died 1658), Anglican clergyman
 Sir Robert Salusbury Cotton, 5th Baronet (1739–1809), MP for Cheshire 1780–1796
 Sir Randolph Crewe (also Crew) (bap. 1559, d. 1646), judge
 Sir Julian Critchley (1930–2000), journalist and politician
 Henry Page Croft, 1st Baron Croft   (1881–1947), Conservative politician
 Assheton Henry Cross, 3rd Viscount Cross (1920–2004), racing driver and soldier
 John Cuckney, Baron Cuckney (1925–2008), industrialist, civil servant, and peer
 Francis Hovell-Thurlow-Cumming-Bruce, 8th Baron Thurlow  (1912–2013), diplomat
 Roualeyn Cumming-Bruce  (1912–2000), judge

D

 Charles Darwin     (1809–1882), naturalist, geologist, and originator of the theory of natural selection
 Peter Davis (born 1941), businessman, former chairman of Sainsbury's
 William Davison, 1st Baron Broughshane  (1872–1953), politician and MP for Kensington South 
 Francis Day  (1829–1889), military surgeon and ichthyologist
 Paul Edward Dehn (1912–1976), writer and film critic
 Charles Spencer Denman, 5th Baron Denman, 2nd Baronet  (1916–2012), businessman and peer
 General Sir Miles Christopher Dempsey     (1896–1969), D-Day 2nd Army Commander
 Hal Dixon  (1928–2008), biochemist and Vice Provost of King's College, Cambridge
 Sir Thomas Dunlop, 3rd Baronet  (1912–1999), Scottish businessman
 John Freeman Milward Dovaston, (1782–1854), naturalist and poet
 Andrew Downes (c. 1549 – 1628), Greek scholar
 Sir Henry Edward Leigh Dryden, 4th Baronet of Ambrosden, 7th Baronet of Canons-Ashby (1818–1899), archaeologist and antiquary
 Cyril Henty-Dodd (1935–2009), interviewer and radio disc jockey, commonly known as 'Simon Dee'

E

 Humphrey Edwards (1582–1658), politician and regicide of King Charles I 
 Alexander John Ellis  (1814–1890), phonetician and mathematician
 Charles Evans (1918–1995), surgeon and mountaineer
 William Addams Williams Evans (1853–1919), international footballer
 Canon Thomas Saunders Evans (1816–1889), Latin scholar and poet, was schoolmaster at Rugby and Durham.
 Walter Ewbank (1918–2014), priest and author

F

 Edmund Ffoulkes (1820–1894), clergyman
 George Fielding  (1915–2005), Major in the SOE 
 Frederick Fisher (born 1985), Big Brother 10 contestant
 Paul Foot (1937–2004), journalist, co-founder of Private Eye
 William Orme Foster (1814–1899), ironmaster, MP for South Staffordshire 1857–1868, owner of Apley Hall
 Nigel Forman (1943–2017), Conservative politician, MP for Carshalton and Wallington 
 James Fraser (1818–1885), bishop of Manchester
 Abraham Fraunce (France) (born c. 1558–1560, died 1592/3), poet and lawyer

G

 William Garnett (1816–1903), cricketer and clergyman
 David Gay  (1920–2010), British Army officer awarded the Military Cross in World War II, cricketer, and educator
 Arthur Herman Gilkes (1849–1922), Headmaster of Dulwich College
 Edwin Gifford  (1820–1905) Anglican priest and author
 Geoffrey Green (1911–1990), football writer
 Fulke Greville, 1st Baron Brooke, 13th Baron Latimer and 5th Baron Willoughby de Broke   of Beauchamps Court (1554–1628), courtier and author
 Lawrence Grossmith (1877-1944), actor
 Sir George Abraham Grierson   (1851–1941), administrator in India and philologist
 George Gore (1675–1753), landowner and Attorney-General for Ireland
 Richard Goulding, actor 
 Henry Melvill Gwatkin (1844–1916), historian and theologian
 Lieutenant General Willoughby Gwatkin  (1859–1925), officer and Chief of the General Staff of the Canadian Militia

H

 Nick Hancock (born 1962), actor and TV presenter
 John Hanmer (1574–1629), bishop of St Asaph
 Gathorne Gathorne-Hardy, 1st Earl of Cranbrook   (1814–1906), politician
 Sir Jack Ashford Harris, 2nd Baronet (1906–2009), businessman 
 Sir Paul Harris, 2nd Baronet (1595–1644), politician and Surveyor of the Ordnance 
 Thomas Emerson Headlam (1813–1875), barrister and politician
 William Henry Herford (1820–1908), educationist
 Sir Denis Maurice Henry  (1931–2010), barrister and Lord Justice of Appeal
 Michael Heseltine   (born 1933), Conservative politician, Deputy Prime Minister 1995–1997
 Major Richard Henry Heslop  (alias Xavier) (1907–1973), army officer and resistance organiser
 Sir Thomas Hewett, (1656–1726), architect and landowner
 Edward Hewetson (1902–1977) cricketer
 Sir John Tomlinson Hibbert  (1824–1908), politician
 Horatio Hildyard (1805–1886), cricketer and clergyman
 James Hildyard (1809–1887), classical scholar
 Sir Richard Hill, 2nd Baronet of Hawkstone, (1732–1808), Tory MP and religious revivalist 
 Richard Hillary (1919–1943), RAF officer and author
 John Hirsch (1883–1958), South African cricketer and rugby union international
 Hubert Ashton Holden (1822–1896), classical scholar
 William Walsham How (1823–1897), bishop of Wakefield
 Robert Hudson (1920–2010), BBC broadcaster and administrator
 Edward Hopkins (1600–1657), politician and Governor of Connecticut  
 Francis Hovell-Thurlow-Cumming-Bruce, 8th Baron Thurlow  (1912-2013), diplomat and colonial governor
 Sir James Roualeyn Hovell-Thurlow-Cumming-Bruce (1912-2000), barrister and Lord Justice of Appeal  
 James Humphreys (1768–1830), law reformer
 Sir Travers Humphreys (1867–1956), barrister judge
 David Lafayette Hunter  (1919–2001), officer

I

 William Inge (1829–1903), cricketer, clergyman and Provost of Worcester College, Oxford
 Brian St John Inglis (1916–1993), journalist
Richard Ingrams (born 1939), journalist, co-founder of Private Eye
 Andrew Irvine (1902–1924), mountaineer

J

 Jamie Catto (born 1968), economist and programmer 
 Frederick John Jackson,  (1860–1929), Governor of Uganda (1911–1918) and naturalist
 Sir William Godfrey Fothergill Jackson,  (1917–1999), army officer, military historian, and Governor of Gibraltar
 George Jeffreys, 1st Baron Jeffreys (1645–1689), judge
 Basil Jones (1822–1897), bishop of St David's
 Vice Admiral Clive Carruthers Johnstone (born 1963), Royal Navy Officer
 John Jones of Gellilyfdy (c. 1578 – c. 1658), copyist and manuscript collector
 Sir Thomas Jones (1614–1692), judge and law reporter
 Thomas Jones (1756–1807), academic and Head Tutor at Trinity College, Cambridge

K

 Benjamin Hall Kennedy (1804–1889), headmaster and classical scholar
 Charles Rann Kennedy (1808–1867), lawyer and classical scholar
 Sir Harold Baxter Kittermaster  (1879–1939), governor of British Somaliland 1926–31, British Honduras 1932–34 and the Nyasaland protectorate 1934-39 
 Francis King  (1923–2011), novelist and poet
 George Kemp, 1st Baron Rochdale  (1866–1945), politician, businessman, soldier and cricketer

L

 Richard Cornthwaite Lambert (1868–1939), barrister and politician
 John Heath Lander (1907–1941), Olympic rower and soldier
 Geoffrey Lane, Baron Lane  (1918–2005), Lord Chief Justice of England and Wales
 Sir John Langford-Holt (1916–1993), politician and MP for Shrewsbury 1945–83
 Richard Law, 1st Baron Coleraine   (1901–1980), politician and son of Prime Minister Bonar Law
 Aubrey Trevor Lawrence  (1875–1930), barrister and author
 Sir William Lawrence, 3rd Baronet (1870–1934), English horticulturalist and hospital administrator 
 Sir Martin Le Quesne  (1917–2004), diplomat, ambassador to Mali and Algeria, high commissioner to Nigeria
 Steve Leach (born 1993), cricketer
 Blessed Richard Leigh (1557–1588), beatified English Catholic priest
 Sir Charlton Leighton, 4th Baronet (1747–1784), politician and owner of Loton Park
 Sir William Leighton (c. 1565–1622), poet and composer
 Very Rev Herbert Mortimer Luckock (1833–1909), Dean of Lichfield
 Alexander Loveday (1888–1962), economist and Warden of Nuffield College, Oxford
 General Sir Daniel Lysons  (1816–1898), army officer

M

 Humphrey Mackworth (1603–1654), member of Shropshire parliamentary committee in English Civil War, governor of Shrewsbury, member of Protector's Council, MP
 Thomas Mackworth (1627–1696), Parliamentarian soldier and MP 
 Humphrey Mackworth (born 1631), military governor of Shrewsbury under Protectorate, MP
 Christopher MacLehose  (born 1940), publisher
 Richard Madox (1546–1583), Church of England clergyman and diarist
 Harry Mallaby-Deeley (1863-1937), politician, MP for Harrow and Willesden East
 George Augustus Chichester May  (1815–1892), judge
 Sir Mark Moody-Stuart  (born 1940), ex-chairman of Royal Dutch Shell and chairman of UN Global Compact Committee 
 John Eyton Bickersteth Mayor  (1825–1910), classicist and librarian of Cambridge University 
 Robert Alexander Holt Methuen, 7th Baron Methuen (1931–2014), peer 
 Claas Mertens (born 1992), rower for the German national team
 Sotherton Micklethwait (1823-1889), cricketer and clergyman 
 Terry Milewski (born 1949), journalist
 Henry Arthur Morgan (1830-1912), academic and Master of Jesus College, Cambridge
 Sir George Osborne Morgan, 1st Baronet  (1826–1897), lawyer and politician
 Henry Whitehead Moss (1841–1917), headmaster 1866–190
 Francis Morse (1818–1886), priest 
 Sydney Morse (1854–1929), rugby player
 Gerard Moultrie (1829–1885), third master, chaplain, hymnographer
 Douglas Muggeridge (1928–1985), Controller, BBC Radio 1 between 1968 and 1976
 Hugh Andrew Johnstone Munro (1819–1885), classical scholar
 General Sir Geoffrey Musson  (1910–2008), officer and Adjutant-General to the Forces

N

 William Napper (1880–1967), Irish cricketer and British Army officer
 The Very Rev. Stephen Nason (1901–1975), priest 
 Robert Needham, 1st Viscount Kilmorey (1565–1631), politician
 Christopher Nevinson  (1889–1946), artist
 Henry Woodd Nevinson (1856–1941), social activist and journalist
 John Nottingham (1928-2018), colonial administrator and politician 
 Sir Charles Thomas Newton  (1816–1894), archaeologist
 Nevil Shute Norway (1899–1960), novelist as Nevil Shute and aeronautical engineer

O

 Sir Charles Oakeley, 1st Baronet (1751–1826), administrator in India
 William Oakley (1873–1934), footballer for England
 Mark Oakley (born 1968), Church of England priest 
 William Chichester O'Neill, 1st Baron O'Neill (1813–1883), Church of Ireland clergyman and composer
 Julian Orchard (1930–1979), film and television actor
 Sir Roger Ormrod  (1911–1992), judge, Lord Justice of Appeal
 Sir Francis Ottley (1601–1649), royalist politician and soldier, military governor of Shrewsbury
 Richard Ottley (1626–1670), royalist soldier and Restoration MP

P

 Thomas Ethelbert Page  (1850–1936), classicist
 General Sir Bernard Charles Tolver Paget  (1887–1961), army officer
 Edward Francis Paget (1886–1971), Archbishop of Central Africa
 Francis Paget (1851–1911), 33rd Bishop of Oxford
 Luke Paget (1853-1937), 34th Bishop of Chester
 Stephen Paget (1855–1926), writer and pro-vivisection campaigner
 Frederick Apthorp Paley (1815–1888), classical scholar and writer
 Sir Michael Palin  (born 1943), member of Monty Python comedy troupe, writer, actor and world traveller
 John Parker Ravenscroft (1939–2004), DJ and journalist, known professionally as 'John Peel'
 Sir Nicholas Penny  (born 1949), art historian and Director of the National Gallery
 Lieutenant General Sir Arthur Purves Phayre  (1812–1885), British Indian Army officer; 1st Commissioner of British Burma (1862–1867) and Governor of Mauritius (1874–1878)
 General Sir Robert Phayre GCB, ADC (1820-1897)
 Ambrose Philips (1674–1749), poet and playwright
 John Arthur Pilcher  (1912–1990), diplomat, ambassador to Austria (1965–67), ambassador to Japan (1967–1972)
 Graham Pollard (1903–1976), bookseller and bibliographer
 Angus Pollock (born 1962), cricketer
 Henry Steven Potter (1904-1976), Chief Secretary of Uganda and Kenya, later British Resident in Zanzibar 
 Michael Proctor (1950–), physicist, mathematician, academic and Provost of King's College, Cambridge 
 Sir Thomas Powys (1649–1719), MP, Attorney General to King James II, judge, and politician

R

 Henry Cecil Raikes  (1838–1891), Conservative politician
 Richard Ramsbotham  (1880–1970), first-class cricketer and educator
 Sir Martin Rees, Baron Rees of Ludlow  (born 1942), British cosmologist and astrophysicist
 John Hamilton Reynolds (1794–1852), poet
 James Riddell (1823–1866), classical scholar and Fellow of Balliol College, Oxford 
 George Rudé (1910–1993), British Marxist Historian
Willie Rushton (1937–1996), cartoonist, comedian, co-founder of Private Eye

S

 Colonel Thomas Sandys (1837–1911), officer and politician 
 Clyde Sanger (born 1928), journalist and author, first Africa correspondent for The Guardian
 George Savile, 1st Marquess of Halifax   (1633–1695), statesman, writer, and politician 
 John Sayer  (1920–2013), first-class cricketer and officer in the Fleet Air Arm and the Royal Navy
 Robert Gould Shaw III (1898–1970), American-born English socialite 
 Desmond Shawe-Taylor (1907–1995), music critic
 Desmond Shawe-Taylor  (born 1955), art historian, Surveyor of the Queen's Pictures
 Nevil Shute (1899–1960), writer (and as Neville Shute Norway an aeronautical engineer) 
 Richard Shilleto (1809–1876), classical scholar 
 Sir Philip Sidney (1554–1586), poet, courtier and soldier 
 Robert Sidney, 1st Earl of Leicester (1529–1586) poet, courtier and politician 
 Air Marshall Sir Michael Simmons  (born 1937), Royal Air Force Officer, Assistant Chief of the Air Staff 
 Sandy Singleton (1914–1999), cricketer
 Sir Norman Skelhorn  (1909–1988), barrister and Director of Public Prosecutions for England and Wales 1964–77
 Ruaidhri Smith (born 1994), Scottish cricketer
 Philip Snow (1907–1985), cricketer
 Sir Frederick Sprott (1863–1943), cricketer and engineer
 William Starkie (1860–1920), Greek scholar, translator of Aristophanes, and President of Queen's College, Galway
 Christopher Steel (1938–1992), composer of classical music
 Thomas Stevens  (1841–1920), Bishop of Barking 
 Sir John Stuttard  (born 1945), Lord Mayor of the City of London 2006–07
 Sir Basil Smallpiece  (1906-1992), businessman 
 Martin Ferguson Smith  (born 1940), scholar and writer, classics and ancient history professor at Durham
 HH Thakore Sahib Shri Sir Bahadursinhji Mansinhji, 26th Thakore Sahib of Palitana  (1900–1964), Ruler of Palitana
 Dick Summers (head of the family steel firm John Summers & Sons

T

 James Taylor (1990–), cricketer
 John Taylor (1704–1766), classical scholar and Church of England clergyman
 John Taylor, Baron Ingrow   (1917–2002), soldier and politician 
 Percy Beart Thomas  (1866–1921), Inspector-General of Police of Madras
 Oliver Thomas (1599/1600–1652), nonconformist minister and author
 Sir William Beach Thomas  (1868–1957), author and journalist 
William Thomson,  (1819–1890), Archbishop of York
 Godfrey Thring (1823–1903), hymn writer
 Henry Thring, 1st Baron Thring  (1818–1907), parliamentary draftsman
 J. C. Thring, notable figure in the early history of association football
 Lt Col. Alfred Tippinge (1817–1898) of the British Grenadiers. Recipient of the Legion of Honour.
 Robert Morton Tisdall (1907–2004), Olympic athlete 
 Richard Todd,  (1919–2009), actor
 Anthony Chenevix-Trench (1919–1979), headmaster of Eton College and Fettes College
 Sir Thomas Trevor (1586–1656), judge
 Patrick Trimby (1972–), cricketer

V

 Sir Harry Bevir Vaisey (1877-1965), High Court of Justice judge
 Sir William Vaughan (died 1649), royalist army officer
 Lieutenant-Colonel Francis William Voelcker  (1896-1954), officer and High Commissioner of Western Samoa

W

 Alan Wace (1879–1957), archaeologist at Cambridge University 1934-44 and professor at the Farouk I University in Egypt 1943–52
 Henry Wace (1853–1947), England international footballer
 Henry William Rawson Wade  (1918–2004), academic lawyer
 Christopher Wallace (British Army officer), 1943–2016
 Graham Wallas (1858–1932), political psychologist, leader of the Fabian Society and co-founder of the London School of Economics
 Sir Francis Bagott Watson   (1907-1992), art historian 
 John Weaver (1673–1760), dancer and choreographer
 Stanley J. Weyman (1855–1928), novelist
 Sir Edgar Whitehead  (1905–1971), prime minister of Rhodesia
 Selby Whittingham (born 1941), art expert and author 
 Charles Wicksteed (1810–1885), Unitarian minister
 Sir Kyffin Williams (1918–2006), Landscape & Portrait Artist
 Sir William Williams, 1st Baronet (1634–1700), lawyer and politician
 Major General Dare Wilson  (1919–2014), SAS officer who introduced attack helicopters to the British military
 Jack Wilson (1914–1997), Olympic rower
 H. de Winton, co-creator of the rules of football
 Samuel Woodhouse (1912-1995), priest and Archdeacon of London  
 Frederic Charles Lascelles Wraxall, 3rd Baronet (1828–1865), writer
 Chandos Wren-Hoskyns  (1812–1876), English landowner, agriculturist, politician and author
Jonathan Wright (born 1953), journalist and literary translator
 John Wylie (1854–1924), 1878 FA Cup winner and England international

Y

 Colonel Sir Charles Edward Yate, 1st Baronet  (1849–1940), administrator in India and politician

References

 
Lists of people by English school affiliation
Shropshire-related lists